The Capitol Theatre was an entertainment venue located at the intersection of Monroe Street and Central Avenue in Passaic, New Jersey. Opened in 1921 as a vaudeville house, the Capitol later served as a movie theater, and then as a venue for rock concerts.

Throughout the 1970s and 1980s, the 3,200-seat theatre was a popular stop on many major rock artist's tours. The venue was known for its in-house video system which resulted in a number of good quality, black and white video bootlegs. After it closed, the building fell into disrepair and it was demolished in April 1991. A shopping center known as Capitol Plaza occupies the site now.

History

Vaudeville and films 
The Capitol Theatre opened on October 7, 1921 with sold-out a concert by the U.S. Marine Band, which helped raise funds for a pipe organ in the city's high school.

By the 1960s, it was known as the Capitol Cinema, and by 1970s the theater was showing adult films.

Rock venue 
On June 27, 1971, the popular Fillmore East theater in Manhattan closed, ending owner and rock promoter Bill Graham's stipulation that acts who played at his venue were prohibited from performing at any theater within 75 miles for the following four months. John Scher, a young rock promoter from West Orange, New Jersey, seized on the closure of the Fillmore East by acquiring the Capitol Theatre and transforming it into a rock venue.

The first concert at The Capitol Theatre was by The J. Geils Band and Humble Pie on December 16, 1971.

The theater closed in 1989 for various reasons, including the changing music industry and the 1981 opening of Brendan Byrne Arena at the nearby Meadowlands Sports Complex. John Scher had also started to promote concerts at the arena, enabling much of the Capitol Theatre staff to obtain employment there when the theater closed.

In popular culture 
The Marshall Tucker Band concert from February 18, 1977 was released on December 4, 2007 as a 2 CD/DVD package called Carolina Dreams Tour '77, marking the 30th anniversary of the concert. This is the only known footage of a complete concert by the original members.

Notable appearances
The Three Stooges - February 14, 1959
The Four Seasons - 1972
Frank Zappa - October 31, 1972 - 2 shows (With the Petite Wazoo Orchestra)
The Beach Boys - November 19, 1972
Genesis - March 1, 1973
 Edgar Winter - March 17, 1973
Bette Midler - March 10, 1973
Jerry Garcia Band - June 6, 1973
Jerry Garcia Band - June 16, 1973
Jerry Garcia Band - September 6, 1973
The Pointer Sisters - December 1, 1973
The Byrds - 1973 (Last concert before break-up)
Mountain - 1973
 Johnny Winter - January 9, 1974
Stray Cats (Stevie Ray Vaughan & Double Trouble were added to the bill a half-hour before showtime)
 Mountain - April 20, 1974
Hot Tuna - October 4, 1974
Lou Reed, Hall & Oates - October 5, 1974
Bruce Springsteen, John Sebastian, Dan Fogelberg - October 18, 1974
Kiss - October 23, 1974
Frank Zappa - November 8, 1974
Jerry Garcia Band - November 9, 1974
Gregg Allman - 1974, Several recordings appear on The Gregg Allman Tour
Procol Harum - 1975, Several recordings appear on Procol's Ninth (Deluxe Edition)
Queen, Argent, Kansas - February 21, 1975 (Sheer Heart Attack Tour)
Jerry Garcia Band - April 5, 1975
Lou Reed - May 3, 1975
Kiss - October 4, 1975 (2 shows)
Fleetwood Mac - October 17, 1975 (on their promotional tour for Fleetwood Mac across the US and Canada. Show was recorded for broadcast on the King Biscuit Flower Hour.)
Jerry Garcia Band - November 11, 1975
Linda Ronstadt - December 6, 1975
Peter Frampton - February 14, 1976 (2 shows) 
Dan Fogelberg - March 20, 1976
Jerry Garcia Band - April 2, 1976
Steve Goodman - April 18, 1976
Grateful Dead - June 16, 17, 18 and 19, 1976 (released as Grateful Dead Download Series Volume 4 and as part of the 30 Trips Around the Sun and June 1976 box sets)
Billy Joel - October 2, 1976
Rush - December 10, 1976
Peter Gabriel - March 5, 1977 (his first concert as a solo artist)
Grateful Dead - April 25, 26 and 27, 1977 (released as Capitol Theatre, Passaic, NJ, 4/25/77 and as part of the 30 Trips Around the Sun box set)
Al Stewart - April 30, 1977
Jerry Garcia Band - November 26, 1977
Rick Danko - December 17, 1977
Randy Newman - February 11, 1978
Jerry Garcia Band - March 17, 1978
Ramones, The Runaways, Tuff Darts - March 25, 1978
Journey - June 10, 1978 (first tour with Steve Perry)
Elvis Costello and the Attractions, Mink DeVille, Nick Lowe & Rockpile - May 5, 1978
Meat Loaf - May 26, 1978
The Rolling Stones - June 14, 1978
Bruce Springsteen & The E Street Band - September 19–21, 1978 (The show of Sep 19 was broadcast throughout the tri-state area)
Frank Zappa - October 13, 1978 (two shows on one day)
The Roches - October 21, 1978
Harry Chapin - October 21, 1978
Parliament-Funkadelic - November 6, 1978
Outlaws and Molly Hatchet - November 10, 1978
Grateful Dead - November 24, 1978
Cheap Trick - December 8, 1978
Robert Gordon and Southside Johnny and the Asbury Jukes - December 30–31, 1978
Heart - January 26, 1979
Willie Nelson and Leon Russell - March 1, 1979
Judy Collins - March 10, 1979 (Hard Times for Lovers tour)
Irakere - March 23, 1979
Toto with Sad Cafe  April 21, 1979
The Who - September 10–11, 1979
Van Morrison - October 6, 1979
Talking Heads - November 17, 1979
Rainbow - December 1, 1979
Jerry Garcia Band - March 1, 1980 (released as Garcia Live Volume One
The Clash - March 8, 1980
Willie Colón & his Orchestra, featuring Rubén Blades and Celia Cruz - March 22, 1980
Cheap Trick - March 29, 1980
Grateful Dead - March 30, 31, and April 1, 1980
The Brothers Johnson - April 25, 1980
Genesis - May 28, 1980
Jerry Garcia Band - July 26, 1980
The English Beat - September 26, 1980
Gary Numan - October 18, 1980
Talking Heads - November 4, 1980
The B-52's - November 7, 1980
The Police - November 29, 1980
The Allman Brothers Band - January 3 and 4, 1981
Jerry Garcia Band - February 13, 1981
Ozzy Osbourne w/ Randy Rhoads on Guitar - April 24, 1981 (with Tommy Aldridge and Rudy Sarzo)
Alice Cooper - October 10, 1981
Jerry Garcia Band - November 6, 1981
Blue Öyster Cult - December 26, 1981
Prince - January 30, 1982 (with Bobby Z., Brown Mark, Dez Dickerson, Doctor Fink and Lisa Coleman)
Jerry Garcia - April 10, 1982
John Mayall & the Bluesbreakers - June 18, 1982 
Jerry Garcia Band - June 24, 1982
Warren Zevon - October 1, 1982
Randy Newman - March 26, 1983
U2 - May 12, 1983
Jerry Garcia Band - June 3, 1983
R.E.M. - June 9, 1984
Culture Club - September 3, 1983 
Jerry Garcia Band - December 10, 1983
George Thorogood and The Destroyers - July 5, 1984
Lou Reed - September 25, 1984 
Jethro Tull – October 28, 1984
Dave Edmunds’ Ten Great Guitars with Link Wray, Dickey Betts, Johnny Winter, Brian Setzer, Steve Cropper, David Gilmour, Neal Schon, Lita Ford and Tony Iommi - November 3, 1984
Jerry Garcia Band - November 24, 1984
Dave Edmunds’ - February 28, 1985
Southside Johnny & the Asbury Jukes with guest appearance by Little Steven - September 20, 1985
Stevie Ray Vaughan & Double Trouble - September 21, 1985
Jerry Garcia Band - January 31, 1986
Beastie Boys - April 1, 1987 (Murphy's Law and Public Enemy open. The first show in which Flavor Flav wears his signature clock necklace on stage.)
Duran Duran - March 11, 1989
Pig Light Show appeared from the Opening Night in December 1971 till the end of June 1973, performing with all artists during those dates.

References

External links
The Capitol Theatre Passaic Website
Extensive collection of photos and programs from the music era of the Capitol

Buildings and structures in Passaic, New Jersey
Theatres in New Jersey
Demolished theatres in the United States
Demolished music venues in the United States
Former cinemas in the United States
Demolished buildings and structures in New Jersey
Buildings and structures demolished in 1991